Raymond Allende (born July 2, 1990), known professionally as ARTZ (previously Anakin ARTZ), is an American rapper, songwriter, and recording artist, event and art curator, from Brooklyn, New York. He is known for his song "off-white", and NFTs artwork. He is the owner and founder of record label and media company, RejectDreams.

Personal life 
Raymond Allende was born on July 2, 1990 and grew up in East New York. At the age of 18, he was hit by a stray bullet.

Career

Music 
At the age 15, ARTZ started his career with recording his first song, which was released in his first full-length project, “Established 1990”. Since then, he and his work has been featured by DJ Enuff and Peter Rosenberg (of Hot 97), major media outlets like Revolt, Rap Radar, Elevator and The Source Magazine. He has collaborated with notable artists such as A Boogie, Busta Rhymes, Cardi B, Pop Smoke, Ari Lennox, Emeli Sande, Smoke DZA and Duckwrth.

In January 2021, his song “Off White” charted 8th on Apple Music, with his extended play “I love Lucy’s” trending and appearing on the main page of the iTunes for weeks. Moreover, his work “Fiona Apple” made it to “The New York” playlist on iTunes. During this time, he made national and international tours, including to Canada, Europe and the UK, and his works surpassed half a billion streams.

His work has been placed on rotation by major radio stations, such as “November” and “Remember” by Pakistani national radio stations, and "The Force" by New York's radio station Hot 97 and Z100, and last fm.

Discography

Mixtapes 

 Dark Matter

NFTs 
In early 2021, he started releasing NFTs, with his first NFT, a 3D image, being sold for $7,777. Till March 2023, ARTZ has sold NFTs worth of half million dollars.

References

External links 
 ARTZ's interview on the TheTylt
 ARTZ's interview on the Modern Mixtape TV

1990 births
Living people
21st-century American singers
21st-century American male singers
Rappers from Brooklyn